The 2016–17 Wagner Seahawks men's basketball team represented Wagner College during the 2016–17 NCAA Division I men's basketball season. The Seahawks were led by fifth-year head coach Bashir Mason. They played their home games at Spiro Sports Center on the school's Staten Island campus and were members of the Northeast Conference. They finished the season 16–14, 11–7 in NEC play to finish in a tie for third place. In the NEC tournament, they beat Fairleigh Dickinson before losing to Saint Francis (PA) in the semifinals.

Previous season 
The Seahawks finished the 2015–16 season 23–11, 13–5 in NEC play to win the regular season championship. They defeated Robert Morris and LIU Brooklyn to advance to the championship game of the NEC tournament where they lost to Fairleigh Dickinson. As a regular season conference champion who failed to win their conference tournament, they received an automatic bid to the National Invitation Tournament where they defeated St. Bonaventure in the first round before losing in the second round to Creighton.

Roster

Schedule and results

|-
!colspan=9 style=| Non-conference regular season

   

 

|-
!colspan=9 style=| NEC regular season  

|-
!colspan=9 style=| NEC tournament

References 

Wagner Seahawks men's basketball seasons
Wagner
Wagner
Wagner